Frank Scalice (born Francesco Scalisi, ; September 23, 1893 – June 17, 1957), also known as "Don Ciccio" and "Wacky", was an Italian-American mobster active in New York City, who led the future Gambino crime family from 1930 to 1931. He was consigliere from 1931 until his murder on June 17, 1957.

Early life
Scalice was born Francesco Scalisi in Palermo, Sicily, Italy on September 23, 1893, to Vincenzo Scalisi and Emanuela Privetera. He was a cousin of Anthony Gaggi's father, and third cousin of Dominick Montiglio, Gaggi's nephew. In 1910s, with his brothers Thomas, Philip, Jack, Joseph and Giovanni, Frank emigrated to the United States, settling in The Bronx. He was married to Joan, and he had five daughters and one step-son. He operated his business from the Little Italy area in the Bronx. He also lived and raised his family in the City Island section of the Bronx. He was involved in many crimes and became Capo in the Brooklyn-based gang of Salvatore D'Aquila. After the murder of D'Aquila on October 10, 1928, the power in New York shifted to Joe Masseria's Manhattan-based gang. The successor of D'Aquila, Manfredi Mineo, connected Masseria with the alliance and came into conflict with Scalice as a result.

Career
On November 5, 1930, Mineo and his underboss, Stefano "Steve" Ferrigno, were murdered by Castellammarese Sicilians, led by Salvatore Maranzano. Scalice became the new boss of the family and a strong ally and supporter of Maranzano in the Castellammarese War.

The Castellammarese War ended on April 15, 1931, when Masseria was killed. Maranzano met with the New York bosses in May 1931 to work out a peace plan and organize the Five Families. Scalice was recognized as the Don of one of the families. However, after the murder of Maranzano on September 10, 1931, new boss Lucky Luciano forced Scalice to resign as family boss. He was replaced with Vincent Mangano.

On September 8, 1945, Scalice helped mobster Bugsy Siegel open the Flamingo Hotel & Casino in Las Vegas. Scalice later became involved in the casino business.

During the Mangano era, Mangano had resented Albert Anastasia's close ties to Luciano and Frank Costello, particularly the fact that they had obtained Anastasia's services without first seeking Mangano's permission. This and other disputes led to heated fights.

Mangano's brother Philip was found dead near Sheepshead Bay, Brooklyn on April 19, 1951. Vincent Mangano disappeared, he was never found and was declared dead ten years later. It was widely assumed that Anastasia had them killed.

After the deaths of the Manganos, Anastasia became the boss of the family, promoting Scalice as underboss.

Death
On June 17, 1957, Scalice was assassinated by two gunmen at a vegetable market in the Bronx, for selling memberships in the family. Scalice's funeral was held at the Scocozza Funeral Home in the Bronx. Police and federal agents attended the funeral and the Bronx District Attorney subpoenaed all the visitor records. Scalice is buried in Woodlawn Cemetery in the Bronx.

After his death, Carlo Gambino became Anastasia's underboss.

On September 7 of that year, Scalice's brother Joseph was murdered and declared missing on September 10. According to Joseph Valachi, he was killed by James Squillante, after he threatened to avenge Frank's murder, and like that of his brother it was ordered by Anastasia.

On April 27, 1959, Scalice's brother Giovanni, who had been held as a witness in his brother's murder, was discharged, and took a plane to Paris.

In popular culture
The murder of Scalice inspired the assassination attempt on Vito Corleone in The Godfather, who was shot and critically wounded while buying fruit at a fruit stand.

References

Sources

Notes

External links

1893 births
1957 deaths
1957 murders in the United States
American crime bosses
Bosses of the Gambino crime family
Burials at Woodlawn Cemetery (Bronx, New York)
Deaths by firearm in the Bronx
Gambino crime family
Italian emigrants to the United States
Italian crime bosses
Gangsters from Palermo
Male murder victims
Murdered American gangsters of Italian descent
Murdered American gangsters of Sicilian descent
Murdered Italian gangsters
People from City Island, Bronx
People murdered by the Gambino crime family
People murdered in New York City
Unsolved murders in the United States